Fairfield Township is a township in Jackson County, Iowa, USA.

History
Fairfield Township was established in 1845.

References

Townships in Jackson County, Iowa
Townships in Iowa
1845 establishments in Iowa Territory